A referendum on becoming a US commonwealth was held in the Northern Mariana Islands on 17 June 1975. The proposal was approved by 79% of voters. As a result, the United States Congress approved the change of status on 24 March 1976.

Background
Four previous referendums on either integration with Guam or the islands' status had been held in 1958, 1961, 1963 and 1969. On each occasion a majority of Northern Mariana Islands voters had been in favor of integration with Guam, but Guamanian voters rejected integration in a 1969 referendum.

On 20 February 1975 the Northern Marianas' District Legislature put forward proposals to become a US commonwealth. A threshold of 55% in favor was set in order for the referendum to pass.

Results

See also
 Marianas Political Status Commission

References

Northern Mariana
1975 in the Northern Mariana Islands
Constitutional referendums in the Northern Mariana Islands
June 1975 events in Oceania